Morten Nielsen is a Danish footballer who plays as a forward.

Career 

Nielsen began his career with KB, before joined Chelsea's academy in 2005 and became a pro in July 2007. He has made several appearances for the Danish Under 18 national football team.

On 31 March 2009, whilst being tracked by many European clubs as Rennes, Saint Etienne, Brøndby and Celtic, Nielsen joined Superettan team Landskrona BoIS on loan until the end of the season.

On 9 July 2009, Nielsen ended his contract with Chelsea on a mutual agreement, becoming a free agent, and on 21 July 2009 joined AZ Alkmaar on a free transfer after impressing in a trial. On 13 March 2010, it was announced that he would return to Landskrona BoIS on loan.

In the summer of 2010, he went back to Denmark to play for FC Midtjylland.

In January 2012, he went to play for Greve Fodbold in the Danish fourth tier. The club was at that time managed by his father Benny Nielsen.

In January 2015, he was signed by Sligo Rovers ahead of the 2015 League of Ireland season.

After leaving FC Roskilde in July 2019, Nielsen joined Hvidovre IF. The club announced the signing on 25 August 2019, the same day as he got his official debut for the club. He left the club by the end of the season.

Personal 

Morten is the son of the former professional Danish footballer Benny Nielsen, who now works as an agent.

References 

 FC Roskilde henter Morten N. hjem, bold.dk, 1 February 2016

External links 
 
 Danish national team profile 

1990 births
Living people
Footballers from Copenhagen
Danish men's footballers
Association football forwards
Chelsea F.C. players
Landskrona BoIS players
AZ Alkmaar players
FC Midtjylland players
FC Fredericia players
Greve Fodbold players
FC Rot-Weiß Erfurt players
BK Avarta players
Sligo Rovers F.C. players
FC Roskilde players
Hvidovre IF players
Danish Superliga players
Superettan players
Danish 1st Division players
3. Liga players
League of Ireland players
Denmark youth international footballers
Danish expatriate men's footballers
Danish expatriate sportspeople in England
Danish expatriate sportspeople in Sweden
Danish expatriate sportspeople in the Netherlands
Danish expatriate sportspeople in Germany
Danish expatriate sportspeople in Ireland
Expatriate footballers in England
Expatriate footballers in Sweden
Expatriate footballers in the Netherlands
Expatriate footballers in Germany
Expatriate association footballers in the Republic of Ireland